Two and Three Part Inventions may refer to:

 2 and 3 Part Inventions, a ballet made by Jerome Robbins 
 Inventions and Sinfonias, a collection of thirty short keyboard compositions by Johann Sebastian Bach